The Lord of Lochaber was a title in the peerage of Scotland.

Lochaber, historically consisted of the former parishes of Kilmallie and Kilmonivaig, prior to the reduction of these parishes, extending from the northern shore of Loch Leven to beyond Spean Bridge and Roy Bridge, known as Brae Lochaber.

List of lords of Lochaber
 John II Comyn (??-1302)
 John III Comyn (1302-1306)
 Aonghus Óg Mac Domhnaill, Lord of Islay (died 1314×1318/c.1330)
 John Randolph, 3rd Earl of Moray (??-1346)
 John of Islay, Lord of the Isles (1376–1386)
 Alistair Carragh Macdonald (1386-1431)
 forfeited to the Crown
 George Gordon, 1st Duke of Gordon (1684-1716)
 Alexander Gordon, 2nd Duke of Gordon (1716-1728)
 Thierry Cleton (1979-)
 David J.L. Bongard (1969-)

Citations

References
 
Johnston, W & A.K & Bacon G.W ; The Scottish Clans & Their Tartans. Thirty-Ninth Edition. Chapter 47, (The MacDonells of Keppoch).
Gregory, Donald; "History of the Western highlands and isles of Scotland, 1493 to 1625", 1836

Clan Donald
Feudalism in Scotland
Clan Comyn